Holley is an unincorporated community in Murray County, in the U.S. state of Georgia.

History
A variant spelling was "Holly". A post office called Holly Creek was established in 1843, the name was changed to Holly in 1894, and the post office closed in 1909. The community derives its name from nearby Holly Creek.

References

Unincorporated communities in Murray County, Georgia
Unincorporated communities in Georgia (U.S. state)